Joan Vila Dilmé (born September 26, 1965), known as The Caretaker of Olot and The Angel of Death, is a Spanish serial killer and nursing assistant. He is responsible for at least 11 murders committed at the Fundació La Caritat in Olot between August 2009 and October 2010, with all his victims being elderly patients aged 80–96.

In 2014, he was found guilty by the Supreme Court of Spain and sentenced to 127 years and a half imprisonment for his crimes.

Biography

Childhood and youth 
Joan Vila Dilmé was born on September 26, 1965 in Castellfollit de la Roca, Catalonia (Spain), the son of a working class-family of embutido makers. An asocial and insecure individual, Vila avoided interacting with his peers due to worries about his acne, sexuality and the significant tremors in his hands. After his arrest, Vila would acknowledge that throughout his childhood and youth, he felt like "a woman trapped inside a man's body" and that his homosexuality had influenced some of his habits –  a fact which psychiatrists deemed to be a result of his mental anguish.

Adulthood 
For a while, Vila occupied a small apartment in Castelló d'Empúries, and later opened a hairdressing salon named Tons Cabell-Moda in Figueres, but it quickly shut down, allegedly because his partner had scammed him. He later changed a myriad of jobs in the plastics, textile and skiing industries, and even owned a restaurant, the Casino de Peralada. In addition to this, he also took on training courses in cooking, chiropractic, dressmaking and reflexology.

Eventually, Vila was hired by a small private nursing home in Banyoles, El Mirador de Banyoles, where he worked as a nursing assistant for about eight months. While there, he was regarded very highly by coworkers, who considered him an affectionate and attentive person. For a short period, he also worked at the psychiatric center in Salt.

Psychiatric issues 
Despite his accomplishments, Vila's mental state gradually worsened, as he had frequent panic attacks, very low self-esteem and was easily influenced by those around him.  A heavy smoker, he was diagnosed with obsessive–compulsive disorder, while his tremors and sweating problems growing worse. In addition, he consumed many energy drinks (often mixed with anxiolytics and alcohol), was maniacal on cleanliness and followed a compulsive diet.

At the same time, Vila also began a develop an unprecedented fondness for putting make-up on the recently deceased, which was backed up by writings found on his personal computer's hard drive by the Mossos d'Esquadra. He also had multiple books on paranormal phenomena and death, which he acquired from a local hairdresser friend. After Vila's arrest, he was ordered to undertake a psychiatric evaluation, which determined that he suffered from severe depression.

Murders

Initial murders 
In the beginning of 2006, after having worked in Banyoles and Salt, Vila was hired as a nursing assistant at the Fundació La Caritat nursing home in Olot, next to the Fluvià River. At the time the home was run by psychologist Joan Sala, who saw no harm in the new employee. Vila's shifts were divided between holidays and weekends, and thus, he worked during hours when few staff was present at the facility.

After working there for three and a half years without incident, Vila began killing his patients in August 2009. When committing the killings, he would use two methods: either orally administer a cocktail of barbiturates and drugs mixed with water, or perform intravenous injections with high doses of insulin, which he reserved for diabetic victims. Each death occurred within months of the last one, with several relatives reporting that their loved ones had died an agonizing death, with some of them bleeding from the mouth. The victims, who were predominantly women aged 80–96, were Rosa Barbures Pujol, Francisca Matilde Fiol, Teresa Puig Boixadera, Isidra García Aseijas, Carme Vilanova Viñolas, Lluís Salleras Claret, Joan Canal Julià i Montserrat Canalias Muntada.

Latter murders 
From 2006 up until the autumn of 2010, Vila lamented to his colleagues that 'all the old women were dying on him'. The rest of the staff agreed that Vila was an efficient and attentive nurse, who put in a lot of effort into explaining the circumstances of death to the deceased patients' relatives. In late September, however, he began to undergo a change of character, becoming more uncompromising and violent. He stated that he was fed up with elderly patients, that he wanted to change jobs, and after the murder of Joan Canal Julià on September 19, 2010, he forced a co-worker to enter the man's room to watch over his body.

The last three murders took place within the span of five days between October 12 and 17: Sabina Masllorens i Sala on the 12th, Montserrat Guillamet Bartolich on the 16th and Paquita Gironès i Quintana on the 17th. In the commission of these murders, Vila had forced his victims to drink bleach, or injected them with acid or other corrosive substances directly into the mouth. This technique proved to cause excruciating pains to the victim, with the sodium hypochlorite causing several internal burns in the esophagus, mucous membrane and the lungs. At trial, Vila confessed that he had been drinking wine with Coca-Cola for 10 days, and that after killing Masllorens, he had gone home and sat down to watch the TV. Later on, he was invited to join the woman's funeral and the subsequent vigil dedicated in her memory.

Murder of Paquita Gironès i Quintana 

Vila's last victim, Paquita Gironès i Quintana, a childless widow suffering from episodes of dementia, was the one who began to arouse suspicion in the facility. She had been interned at La Caritat a few years earlier and developed a very hostile relationship towards Vila, whom she tried to report for abuse for more than a month. Although she referred to him as a "bastard" and claimed that he had slapped her, her accusations were not heeded either by the staff or her niece. During police investigations, it was confirmed that Vila moved Gironès i Quintana in a wheelchair to a ward without any video surveillance, and not long after, the old woman appeared with wounds on her face and breasts.

On the evening of October 17, and according to his confessions, he had been drinking wine and Coca-Cola all day, and upon hearing Gironès i Quintana coughing, he decided to check upon her. After seeing that she was disoriented and had difficulty breathing, Vila went to the supply closet and filled a syringe with laundry detergent, which he then injected directly into the woman's mouth. Gironès i Quintana began to convulse and expel the liquid, and despite being rushed to the emergency room, she died from her injuries.

Arrest 
Vila would eventually be captured by pure chance, following the forensic autopsy on Gironès i Quintana's corpse. The examining coroner refused to classify this as a natural death, and informed the Mossos d'Esquadra on the following day. The team, led by inspector Josep Monteys, concluded that the elderly woman couldn't have been able to ingest the detergent herself, and that they might be dealing with a homicide. Shortly thereafter, Mossos agents examined the security feed, noticing that one of the nurses locked himself in the supply closet shortly before Gironès i Quintana was killed. After questioning the rest of the staff at the facility, the police brought in Vila for further interrogation, whereupon he immediately confessed to two of the murders. Subsequently, he was charged with them and remanded to await trial.

Trial

Confessions and exhumations 
In the days following his arrest, when he was brought to justice in the Jutjat d'instrucció of Olot, Vila confessed to killing the last three victims. He claimed that the deaths of the three elderly women made him feel "as if [he] were God", and that the suffering he inflicted on them with the corrosive substances had been only "a grain of sand compared to the fullness of his death". Following this statement, the court ordered that he be temporarily detained without bail at the Brians 1 Penitentiary Center in Barcelona.

A month later, Vila voluntarily requested to appear before the court, where he confessed to killing 11 elderly patients during his term at La Caritat. Initially, his lawyer Carles Monguilod, who claimed to have a kindred relationship with his client, tried to justify his client's actions by portraying them as euthanisations to end their suffering. The judge ordered the exhumation of other victims' bodies for an autopsy, given that 56 deaths had occurred since Vila had begun work at La Caritat, of which 27 happened during his shifts (48,2%). Months later, in February 2011, the results of the National Institute of Toxicology and those of the Institute of Forensic Medicine of Catalonia – both requested by the judge – couldn't clarify whether other victims had been killed with barbiturates or if they had been poisoned at all, given that the bodies had been highly decomposed. Because of this, it was impossible to verify whether there were more victims or not.

Trial in the Provincial Court of Girona 
Vila's trial began at the Provincial Court of Girona on May 27, 2013, with him initially confessing that the didn't want to hurt the old women and was relieved to see them dead. He was faced with the possibility of a sentence of more than 200 years imprisonment for 11 counts of the murder, the last 3 of which were aggravated. The prosecution argued that the killer took advantage of the times when there was few other staff members, and with his victims being unable to defend themselves, he was able to freely kill without any hindrances.

The trial lasted two weeks and involved more than 120 witnesses and experts. Regarding the psychiatric evaluation, the coordinator of the Psychiatric Hospitalization Unit of Catalonia, Álvaro Muro, declared at trial that the defendant was a kind person to those around him, but his loneliness and introversion made him progressively more dangerous. In addition, despite the treatment he had been receiving in recent years, psychiatrists who evaluated Vila stated that he wasn't a psychopath, did not suffer from a personality split and understood the gravity of his actions, which indicated that there should be no mitigating factors in the sentencing.

Conviction 

On June 21, 2013, the juries (consisting of five men and four women) found Joan Vila Dilmé guilty on all counts and recommended a sentence of 127 and a half years imprisonment for the aggravated murder of the last three victims, and murder with malice aforethought for the remaining ten. In all, of the possible 194 possible years in prison, he received a lesser sentence of 127 due to his confessions, and was prohibited from approaching or contacting any of the victims' family members or relatives for a period of 10 years. While the imposed sentence was 127, the maximum penalty established by criminal law amounted to 40 years imprisonment, which Vila had to serve at the Puig de les Basses Penitentiary Center in Figueres.

In economic terms, the total amount of compensation for the murders amounted to 369,000 euros for Vila from public liability relating to them. Aside from him, the judge also imposed sanctions on La Caritat, based on an article from the Criminal Code of Spain that stated that juridical persons who own an establishment where a worker commits a crime are also liable in civil lawsuits. However, the financial compensation, of between 6,000 and 39,000 euros depending on the relationship of each family member to the victim, was covered by the Zurich Insurance Group.

Vila's defense team filed an appeal to the High Court of Justice of Catalonia, alleging that their client's presumption of innocence had been violated and that he had been sentenced with only his confession as evidence, as by that time, the autopsies on the victims hadn't concluded. The request was denied on February 23, 2014. An appeal was then forwarded to the Supreme Court of Spain, which also rejected the appeal on October 10 of that year.

See also
 List of serial killers by country

References

Bibliography 
 
 
 
 * {{Cite book|last=Matías Crowder, libro El celador de Olot, Editorial Sin Ficción, 2022. https://alreveseditorial.com/libros/el-celador-de-olot

External links 
 Supreme Court v. Joan Vila Dilmé
 The Caretaker of Olot - TV report on TV3's "Crimes" program [Accessed February 12, 2020] (in Catalan)
 

1965 births
21st-century Spanish criminals
Male serial killers
Medical serial killers
Spanish LGBT people
Living people
People from Garrotxa
Poisoners
Prisoners and detainees of Spain
Spanish male criminals
Spanish people convicted of murder
Spanish prisoners and detainees
Spanish prisoners sentenced to life imprisonment
Spanish serial killers